The Ideographic Research Group (IRG), formerly called the Ideographic Rapporteur Group, is a subgroup of Working Group 2 (WG2) of ISO/IEC JTC 1/SC 2 (SC 2), the subcommittee of the Joint Technical Committee of ISO and IEC which is responsible for developing standards within the field of coded character sets. IRG is composed of experts from China, Japan, South Korea, Vietnam and other countries and regions that use Han characters, as well as experts representing the Unicode Consortium. The group is responsible for coordinating the addition of new CJK unified ideographs to the Universal Multiple-Octet Coded Character Set (ISO/IEC 10646) and the Unicode Standard. The group meets twice a year for 4-5 days each time, and reports its activity to the subsequent meeting of WG2.

History
The precursor to the Ideographic Rapporteur Group was the CJK Joint Research Group (CJK-JRG), which was established in 1990. In October 1993 this group was established as a subgroup of WG2 under SC2 with the name Ideographic Rapporteur Group (IRG). In June 2019 SC2 changed the name of the subgroup to Ideographic Research Group (IRG).

The IRG rapporteur from 1993 to 2004 was Zhang Zhoucai (张轴材), who had been convenor and chief editor of CJK-JRG from 1990 to 1993. Since 2004 the rapporteur has been Professor Lu Qin (陸勤) of the Hong Kong Polytechnic University. In June 2018 the title of "Rapporteur" was changed to "Convenor".

Overview
IRG is responsible for reviewing proposals for adding new CJK unified ideographs to the Universal Multiple-Octet Coded Character Set (ISO/IEC 10646) and the Unicode Standard, and submitting consolidated proposals for sets of CJK unified ideographs to WG2, which are then processed for encoding in the ISO/IEC 10646 and Unicode standards by SC2 and the Unicode Technical Committee respectively. National and liaison bodies of SC2 that participate in IRG include China, Hong Kong, Japan, North Korea, South Korea, Macau, Singapore, Taipei Computer Association, Unicode Consortium, United Kingdom, and Vietnam.

As of Unicode version 15.0, the IRG has been responsible for submitting several blocks of CJK unified ideographs and compatibility ideographs for encoding:

 CJK Unified Ideographs (added in Unicode 1.0)
 CJK Unified Ideographs Extension A (added in Unicode 3.0)
 CJK Unified Ideographs Extension B (added in Unicode 3.1)
 CJK Unified Ideographs Extension C (added in Unicode 5.2)
 CJK Unified Ideographs Extension D (added in Unicode 6.0)
 CJK Unified Ideographs Extension E (added in Unicode 8.0)
 CJK Unified Ideographs Extension F (added in Unicode 10.0)
 CJK Unified Ideographs Extension G (added in Unicode 13.0)
 CJK Unified Ideographs Extension H (added in Unicode 15.0)
 CJK Compatibility Ideographs (added in Unicode 1.0)
 CJK Compatibility Ideographs Supplement (added in Unicode 3.1)

Since 2015, proposed characters submitted by IRG member bodies have been processed in batches called "IRG Working Sets". Each working set undergoes several years of review by IRG experts before official submission of the working set to WG2 as a new block. Once accepted by WG2, the proposed block is processed according to the individual procedures followed by ISO/IEC JTC1 SC2 and the Unicode Technical Committee (UTC). In the case of SC2, this involves balloting of ISO member bodies. The following working sets have been processed by IRG:
 WS2015 became CJK Unified Ideographs Extension G (Unicode 13.0, 2020);
 WS2017 became CJK Unified Ideographs Extension H (Unicode 15.0, 2022);
 WS2021 may become CJK Unified Ideographs Extension I at a future date.

IRG Working Document Series 
The IRG Working Document Series (IWDS) is a set of documents outlining guidelines for Han unification, including the Unifiable Component Variations (UCV) list.

 https://appsrv.cse.cuhk.edu.hk/~irg/irgwds.html
 https://hc.jsecs.org/irg/iwds/ucv.php

References

External links
 IRG homepage, including meeting documents and Working Set revisions
 Working Set 2015 Online Review Tool
 Working Set 2017 Online Review Tool
 Working Set 2021 Online Review Tool

Unicode
International Organization for Standardization
Internationalization and localization